The Church of the Holy Saviour is a Serbian Orthodox church located in Prizren, Kosovo, built around 1330.

The church was declared a Monument of Culture of Exceptional Importance in 1990, and it is protected by the Republic of Serbia. It was heavily damaged during the 2004 unrest in Kosovo.

See also

Monument of Culture of Exceptional Importance
Tourism in Kosovo
Prizren

References 

Cultural Monuments of Exceptional Importance (Serbia)
14th-century Serbian Orthodox church buildings
Serbian Orthodox church buildings in Kosovo
Medieval Serbian sites in Kosovo
1330 establishments in Europe
Destroyed churches in Kosovo
Cultural heritage monuments in Prizren District
Architecture in Serbia
Persecution of Serbs
Churches in Prizren